Blastobasis babae is a moth in the family Blastobasidae. It is found in Costa Rica.

The length of the forewings is 4.8–5 mm. The forewings are pale brown intermixed with a few brown and dark-brown scales. The hindwings are translucent pale brown.

Etymology
The specific epithet is derived from Latin babae (meaning an exclamation of astonishment or joy).

References

Moths described in 2013
Blastobasis